JDVM Inter College is a high school in the rural district of Unnao, Uttar Pradesh. It is situated in Osiyan village. Its principal is Sushil Kumar Shukla, and it is owned by Narendra Bhadhauriya. It was one of fifteen schools in Uttar Pradesh to achieve 100% examination results in 2008.

References

High schools and secondary schools in Uttar Pradesh
Intermediate colleges in Uttar Pradesh
Education in Unnao
Educational institutions in India with year of establishment missing